The 2011 All-Ireland Colleges Camogie Championship was won by Loreto, Kilkenny, who defeated St Patrick's Maghera by 4–10 to 1–6 in the final on March 1, 2011.

2011 Final

{| style="font-size: 90%" cellspacing="0" cellpadding="0" align="center"
|colspan="4"|St Patrick's Maghera|-
!width="25"| !!width="25"|
|-
|GK ||1 || Jolene Bradley
|-
|RCB ||2 || Maeve Quinn 
|-
|FB ||3 || Aine McElwee
|-
|LCB ||4 || Rebecca Ferguson
|-
|RWB ||5 || Gráinne Ní Chatháin (O’Kane)
|-
|CB ||6 || Aoife Ní Chaiside
|-
|LWB ||7 || Dervla O’Neill
|-
|MF ||8 || Teresa McElroy 0-1
|-
|MF ||9 || Karen Kielt 0-2
|-
|RWF ||10|| Gráinne McNicholl (captain) 0-3 frees
|-
|CF ||11|| Caoimhe Moran
|-
|LWF ||12|| Shauna Quinn
|-
|RCF ||13|| Noleen McKenna
|-
|FF ||14|| Shannon Kearney 1-0
|-
|LCF ||15|| Mary Kelly
|colspan=4|
|-
|Substitutes:|-
|RWB || || Catherine McCloskey for Ní Chatháin
|-
|-
|LWB || || Danielle Quinn for O’Neill
|-
|-
|RWB || || Gráinne Ní Chatháin for McCloskey
|-
|}MATCH RULES'''
60 minutes
Extra Time if scores level
Maximum of 5 substitutions

External links
 Official Camogie Website

All-Ireland Colleges Camogie Championship
All-Ireland Colleges Camogie Championship